Sultanpur is a constituency of the Uttar Pradesh Legislative Assembly covering the city of Sultanpur in the Sultanpur district of Uttar Pradesh, India.

Sultanpur is one of five assembly constituencies in the Sultanpur Lok Sabha constituency. Since 2008, this assembly constituency is numbered 188 amongst 403 constituencies.

Election results

2022

2017
Bharatiya Janta Party candidate Surya Bhan Singh won in 2017 Uttar Pradesh Legislative Elections defeating Bahujan Samaj Party candidate Syed Mujeed Ahmad by a margin of 32,393 votes.

References

External links
 

Assembly constituencies of Uttar Pradesh
Sultanpur, Uttar Pradesh